Edward Rudolph Mekjian (June 14, 1952 – November 27, 2021), known professionally as Eddie Mekka, was an American actor, best known for his role as Carmine Ragusa on the hit television sitcom Laverne & Shirley.

Early life
Mekka was born in Worcester, Massachusetts, the son of Mariam (née Apkarian), a dry cleaning presser, and Vahe Vaughn Mekjian, a factory worker. His family was of Armenian descent. His father was a World War II veteran. He graduated from Burncoat High School and attended the Berklee College of Music.

Career

In the early 1970s, Mekka headed the Worcester County Light Opera in Massachusetts, teaching young people how to sing. After performing on Broadway in The Lieutenant, for which he was nominated for a Tony Award, he moved to Los Angeles. He landed the role of Carmine "The Big Ragoo" Ragusa for Laverne & Shirley in 1976, acting on the series until its 1983 cancellation. 

Mekka starred in roughly 50 TV shows and movies throughout his career. His television credits included 24, The Suite Life of Zack & Cody, It's Always Sunny in Philadelphia, The Bold and the Beautiful, and as Detective Murdoch in the Fox television movie Catch Me If You Can. He had a small role in the Penny Marshall-directed 1992 film A League of Their Own as the dance partner of Mae (Madonna) in the bar.

On stage, he performed in Hairspray at the Luxor in Las Vegas, Nevada, and in a national tour of Grease with Cindy Williams. Mekka returned to off-Broadway theatre on July 15, 2008, starring in Steve Solomon's long-running comedy My Mother's Italian, My Father's Jewish & I'm In Therapy! at the Westside Theatre.

Mekka had regular solo singing performances for many years from the 1990s into the 2000s throughout the Naples and the Fort Lauderdale, Florida areas. 

Mekka reunited with his Laverne & Shirley co-star Cindy Williams in a November 2008 regional production of the Renée Taylor-Joseph Bologna comedy play It Had to Be You.

In 2008, Mekka wrapped production in the independent film Code Enforcer. He starred with Erin Moran of Happy Days.

In 2010, Mekka starred as Tevye in Fiddler on the Roof at the John W. Engeman Theater in Northport, New York from April 29 until June 20.

Personal life
Mekka was married to actress DeLee Lively from 1983 to 1992. He married Yvonne Marie Grace in 1994. Together they had one daughter, Mia. 

Mekka died in Newhall, Santa Clarita, California on November 27, 2021 at the age of 69.

Filmography

Film

Television

References

External links
 
 
 

1952 births
2021 deaths
20th-century American male actors
21st-century American male actors
American male film actors
American male musical theatre actors
American male stage actors
American male television actors
American people of Armenian descent
Male actors from Worcester, Massachusetts